The Heiberg Formation is a geological formation in Northwest Territories, Canada.

Vertebrate fauna

See also

 List of stratigraphic units with few dinosaur genera

References

Footnotes

Works cited
 Weishampel, David B.; Dodson, Peter; and Osmólska, Halszka (eds.): The Dinosauria, 2nd, Berkeley: University of California Press. 861 pp. .

Triassic System of North America